Natural Selection is the third compilation album by Australian rock band Hunters & Collectors, released in 2003. The songs are from the band's seven studio albums. The album peaked at Number 40 on the ARIA Charts. It was released in a CD, DVD and limited edition 2× CD formats. It was subsequently reissued as a separate CD on 19 April 2004 and as a separate DVD on 24 November 2003. On 21 October 2011 the 2004 Natural Selection CD and the 2003 Natural Selection DVD were reissued in a two disc pack titled Greatest Hits.

Track listing

Charts

References

Hunters & Collectors albums
2003 compilation albums
Liberation Records albums
Compilation albums by Australian artists